is a passenger railway station located in Higashi-ku in the city of Okayama, Okayama Prefecture, Japan. It is operated by the West Japan Railway Company (JR West).

Lines

Station layout
The station consists of a side platform and an island platform, with the station building is located on the side of the side platform for Himeji (Platform 1), and connected to the island platform for Okayama (Platforms 2 and 3) by a footbridge. The station is staffed.

Platforms

History
Seto Station was opened on 18 March 1891. With the privatization of Japanese National Railways (JNR) on 1 April 1987, the station came under the control of JR West.

Passenger statistics
In fiscal 2019, the station was used by an average of 2680 passengers daily

Surrounding area
Okayama City Higashi Ward Office Seto Branch (Former Seto Town Hall)
Okayama Prefectural Seto High School
Okayama Municipal Seto Junior High School

See also
List of railway stations in Japan

References

External links

 JR West Station Official Site

Railway stations in Okayama
Sanyō Main Line
Railway stations in Japan opened in 1891